Composite video is an analog video signal format that carries standard-definition video (typically at 525 lines or 625 lines) as a single channel. Video information is encoded on one channel, unlike the higher-quality S-Video (two channels) and the even higher-quality component video (three or more channels). In all of these video formats, audio is carried on a separate connection.

Composite video is also known by the initials CVBS for composite video baseband signal or color, video, blanking and sync, or is simply referred to as SD video for the standard-definition television signal it conveys.

There are three dominant variants of composite video signals, corresponding to the analog color system used: NTSC, PAL, and SECAM. Usually composite video is carried by a yellow RCA connector, but other connections are used in professional settings, or on devices that are too small for an RCA connector, such as a digital camera.

Signal components 

A composite video signal combines, on one wire, the video information required to recreate a color picture, as well as line and frame synchronization pulses. The color video signal is a linear combination of the luminance of the picture and a modulated subcarrier which carries the chrominance or color information, a combination of hue and saturation. Details of the combining process vary between the NTSC, PAL and SECAM systems.

The frequency spectrum of the modulated color signal overlaps that of the baseband signal, and separation relies on the fact that frequency components of the baseband signal tend to be near harmonics of the horizontal scanning rate, while the color carrier is selected to be an odd multiple of half the horizontal scanning rate; this produces a modulated color signal that consists mainly of harmonic frequencies that fall between the harmonics in the baseband luma signal, rather than both being in separate continuous frequency bands alongside each other in the frequency domain. The signals may be separated using a comb filter. In other words, the combination of luma and chrominance is indeed a frequency-division technique, but it is much more complex than typical frequency-division multiplexing systems like the one used to multiplex analog radio stations on both the AM and FM bands.

A gated and filtered signal derived from the color subcarrier, called the burst or colorburst, is added to the horizontal blanking interval of each line (excluding lines in the vertical sync interval) as a synchronizing signal and amplitude reference for the chrominance signals. In NTSC composite video, the burst signal is inverted in phase (180° out of phase) from the reference subcarrier. In PAL, the phase of the color subcarrier alternates on successive lines. In SECAM, no colorburst is used since phase information is irrelevant.

Composite artifacts

The combining of component signals to form the composite signal does the same, causing a checkerboard video artifact known as dot crawl. Dot crawl is a defect that results from crosstalk due to the intermodulation of the chrominance and luminance components of the signal. This is usually seen when chrominance is transmitted with high bandwidth, and its spectrum reaches into the band of the luminance frequencies. Comb filters are commonly used to separate signals and eliminate these artifacts from composite sources. S-Video and component video avoid this problem as they maintain the component signals separately.

Recording 
Most home analog video equipment record a signal in (roughly) composite format: LaserDiscs store a true composite signal, while consumer videotape formats (including VHS and Betamax) and commercial and industrial tape formats (including U-matic) use modified composite signals (generally known as color-under). The professional D-2 videocassette format digitally records and reproduces composite video signals using PCM encoding of the analog signal on the magnetic tape.

Extensions 
A number of so-called extensions to the visible TV image can be transmitted using composite video. Since TV screens hide the vertical blanking interval of a composite video signal, these take advantage of the unseen parts of the signal. Examples of extensions include teletext, closed captioning, information regarding the show title, a set of reference colors that allows TV sets to automatically correct NTSC hue maladjustments, widescreen signaling (WSS) for switching between 4:3 and 16:9 display formats, etc.

Connectors and cable 

In home applications, the composite video signal is typically connected using an RCA connector, normally yellow. It is often accompanied with red and white connectors for right and left audio channels respectively. BNC connectors and higher quality coaxial cable are often used in professional television studios and post-production applications. BNC connectors were also used for composite video connections on early home VCRs, often accompanied by either RCA connector or a 5-pin DIN connector for audio. The BNC connector, in turn, post dated the PL-259 connector featured on first-generation VCRs.

Video cables are 75 ohm impedance, low in capacitance. Typical values run from 52 pF/m for an HDPE-foamed dielectric precision video cable to 69 pF/m for a solid PE dielectric cable.

Modulators 
Some devices that connect to a TV, such as VCRs, older video game consoles and home computers, output a composite signal. This may then be converted to RF with an external box known as an RF modulator that generates the proper carrier (often for channel 3 or 4 in North America, channel 36 in Europe). Sometimes this modulator was built into the product (such as video game consoles, VCRs, or the Atari, Commodore 64, or TRS-80 CoCo home-computers) and sometimes it was an external unit powered by the computer (in the case of the TI-99/4A or some Apple modulators) or with an independent power supply.

Because of the digital television transition most TV sets sold these days no longer have analog television tuners and cannot accept a signal from an analog modulator. But because composite video has a well-established market for both devices that convert it to channel 3/4 outputs, as well as devices that convert things like VGA to composite, it has offered opportunities to repurpose older composite monitors for newer devices.

Demodulation loss 
The process of modulating RF with the original video signal, and then demodulating the original signal again in the TV, introduces losses including added noise or interference. For these reasons, it is best to use composite connections instead of RF connections if possible. Older video equipment and some very low-end modern televisions have only RF input (essentially the antenna jack). While RF modulators are no longer common, they are still available to translate composite signals for older equipment.

See also 
 List of video connectors
 NTSC color encoding
 PAL color encoding

Notes

References

External links 
 Maxim - Apr 17, 2001 - Video Basics Tutorial covering CVBS format structure.
 

 
Analog video connectors
Film and video technology
Television technology
Repurposing